The 1993–94 Pilkington Cup was the 23rd edition of England's premier rugby union club competition at the time. Bath won the competition defeating Leicester in the final. The event was sponsored by Pilkington and the final was held at Twickenham Stadium.

Draw and results

First round (Sep 11)

Second round (Oct 16)

Away team progress *

Third round (Nov 27)

Fourth round (Dec 18)

Fifth round (Jan 22)

Quarter-finals (Feb 26)

Semi-finals (Apr 2)

Final

References

1993–94 rugby union tournaments for clubs
1993–94 in English rugby union
1993-94